Serradigitus miscionei, commonly known as the Walnut Gulch scorpion, is a rare species of scorpion found only in southern Arizona, United States. This species is one of three Serradigitus species found in Arizona.

Description
Serradigitus miscionei is a small reddish, brown scorpion, adult females reach an average length of only . It was discovered while searching for lizards on the walls of a wash that empties into the San Pedro River. It was described on the first of February 2011 by Richard Ayrey.

Ecology
Serradigitus miscionei seems to prefer vertical sand substrate, which is not commonly seen in other scorpion species. Like most scorpions, Serradigitus miscionei feeds primarily on small invertebrates. Its venom is not known to be medically significant to humans, dogs or other mammals.

References

External links

Vaejovidae
Fauna of the Southwestern United States
Animals described in 2011